Empirical risk minimization (ERM) is a principle in statistical learning theory which defines a family of learning algorithms and is used to give theoretical bounds on their performance. The core idea is that we cannot know exactly how well an algorithm will work in practice (the true "risk") because we don't know the true distribution of data that the algorithm will work on, but we can instead measure its performance on a known set of training data (the "empirical" risk).

Background 
Consider the following situation, which is a general setting of many supervised learning problems.

Note that the assumption of a joint probability distribution allows us to model uncertainty in predictions (e.g. from noise in data) because  is not a deterministic function of  but rather a random variable with conditional distribution  for a fixed .

We also assume that we are given a non-negative real-valued loss function  which measures how different the prediction  of a hypothesis is from the true outcome  The risk associated with hypothesis  is then defined as the expectation of the loss function:
 

A loss function commonly used in theory is the 0-1 loss function: .

The ultimate goal of a learning algorithm is to find a hypothesis  among a fixed class of functions  for which the risk  is minimal:
 

For classification problems, the Bayes classifier is defined to be the classifier minimizing the risk defined with the 0–1 loss function.

Empirical risk minimization 
In general, the risk  cannot be computed because the distribution  is unknown to the learning algorithm (this situation is referred to as agnostic learning). However, we can compute an approximation, called empirical risk, by averaging the loss function on the training set; more formally, computing the expectation with respect to the empirical measure:
 

The empirical risk minimization principle states that the learning algorithm should choose a hypothesis  which minimizes the empirical risk:
 
Thus the learning algorithm defined by the ERM principle consists in solving the above optimization problem.

Properties

Computational complexity 
Empirical risk minimization for a classification problem with a 0-1 loss function is known to be an NP-hard problem even for a relatively simple class of functions such as linear classifiers. Nevertheless, it can be solved efficiently when the minimal empirical risk is zero, i.e., data is linearly separable.

In practice, machine learning algorithms cope with this issue either by employing a convex approximation to the 0–1 loss function (like hinge loss for SVM), which is easier to optimize, or by imposing assumptions on the distribution  (and thus stop being agnostic learning algorithms to which the above result applies).

See also

Maximum likelihood estimation
M-estimator

References

Further reading 
 

Machine learning